Nagin may refer to:

Nāginī, in Indian mythology, a female Nāga
Ichchadhari Naags, shape-shifting Nāgas in Indian folklore

Entertainment
Nagin (1954 film), a Bollywood film directed by Nandlal Jaswantlal
Nagin (1976 film), a Bollywood film directed by Rajkumar Kohli
Nagin (2010 film) (Hisss), a Jennifer Lynch film 
Naaginn (2007 TV series), a 2007–2009 Indian television series
Naagin (2015 TV series), an Indian supernatural drama television series that debuted in 2015
Naagin (Pakistani TV series), a 2017–2019 Pakistani drama television series
Ichhapyaari Naagin, a 2016 Indian television series

People with the surname
Daniel Nagin (born 1948), American criminologist
Ray Nagin (born 1956), mayor of New Orleans

See also
Nag (disambiguation)
Naga (disambiguation)
Nagini (disambiguation)
Nagina (disambiguation)